Jaswal is an Indian surname found among Jat Sikhs and Muslims of Punjab. It is also a clan of Rajputs that commanded the former princely state of Jaswan.

People with the surname 
 Balli Kaur Jaswal, Singaporean novelist
 Nishtha Jaswal, Indian academic and university vice-chancellor
 Paramjit Singh Jaswal, Indian professor
 Seema Jaswal (born 1985), British television and radio presenter
 Umair Jaswal (born 1986), Pakistani actor and musician
 Uzair Jaswal (born 1992), Pakistani actor and musician
 Yasir Jaswal (born 1983), Pakistani actor and musician

References

Rajput clans